Anna Kamińska (born 4 October 1983) is a Polish mountain bike orienteer. She won a gold medal in the sprint event at the 2010 World MTB Orienteering Championships in Montalegre.

References

Polish orienteers
Female orienteers
Polish female cyclists
Mountain bike orienteers
Living people
1983 births
Place of birth missing (living people)
21st-century Polish women